Rameshwar Neekhra also spelt Nikhra is an Indian politician. Neekhra is a cousin of veteran Bollywood actor Ashutosh Rana. He is a Law graduate. He was elected to the Lower House of Parliament the Lok Sabha 7th & 8th loksabha two consecutive terms from Narmadapuram, Madhya Pradesh, India as a member of the Indian National Congress. He was Chairman of Madhya Pradesh State Bar Council for over a decade. 
National Vice-President of Seva Dal from 1987 to 1989, President of Madhya Pradesh Youth Congress 1985–1987, University President of Student Union at Dr Hari Singh Gour University 1968-1970  Founder member of Shikshak Congress and Currently Senior Vice-President of Madhya Pradesh Congress Committee .

References

External links
Official biographical sketch in Parliament of India website

India MPs 1980–1984
India MPs 1984–1989
Indian National Congress politicians
1946 births
Living people
Indian National Congress politicians from Madhya Pradesh